Chinese conquest of Tibet can refer to:

Mongol conquest of Tibet
Chinese expedition to Tibet (1720)
Battle of Chamdo or the Annexation of Tibet by the People's Republic of China